Carl Forgione (3 May 1944 – 10 September 1998) was a British actor, best known for his television appearances.

He appeared in two Doctor Who serials - Planet of the Spiders in 1974 and Ghost Light in 1989.

Other TV credits include Dixon of Dock Green, Jesus of Nazareth, Blake's 7, Star Cops, Coronation Street, Emmerdale Farm and The House of Eliott.

Born of Italian immigrant grandparents, Forgione grew up in the Rhondda Valley. A founder member of Bare Boards Theatre Company, he was diagnosed with cancer in 1995 while performing in The Country Girl in Greenwich. He fought the illness for the next three years, which would claim him.

Filmography

References

External links
 
 http://harperjohn0.tripod.com/carlforgionesite/
 Carl Forgione at Theatricalia

British male television actors
1944 births
1998 deaths
20th-century British male actors
Male actors from Dundee